Avaz ("voice" in persian) is an augmentative and alternative communication (AAC) tool, notable for being India's first successful AAC intervention. It is an electronic version of picture exchange cards, used primarily for children with autism spectrum disorders, cerebral palsy, Angelman's syndrome, Downs syndrome, and other non-verbal disabilities. Avaz was invented by Ajit Narayanan, an invention for which he was on MIT's TR35 list for 2011.

References 

Augmentative and alternative communication